Choi Hyo-joo (born 4 April 1998) is a Chinese-born South Korean table tennis player. Born in China as Yao Yao, she became a naturalized South Korean citizen in November 2013.

She will be representing South Korea at the team event in the 2021 Tokyo Olympics.

Early life and move to Korea
A Jiangsu native, Choi (then known as Yao Yao) attended a table tennis school in Qingdao, Shandong at a young age. In 2009, she finished 8th in the national cadet tournament, behind the likes of Chen Meng, Gu Yuting, Shao Jieni, and Zhu Yuling. She was spotted by Choi Young-il, head coach of the Korean club Samsung Life, who persuaded her to go to South Korea and acquire Korean nationality. Several people helped out with her naturalization: the mother of Jeong Sang-eun, another Chinese-born South Korean player, and Coach Choi's older brother, a public employee, who volunteered to foster her. Later, when she became a naturalized Korean, she adopted the surname Choi.

Achievements

ITTF Tours
Women's singles

Women's doubles

References 

1998 births
Living people
Chinese female table tennis players
South Korean female table tennis players
Table tennis players from Jiangsu
Chinese emigrants to South Korea
Naturalised table tennis players
Naturalized citizens of South Korea
Asian Games medalists in table tennis
Table tennis players at the 2018 Asian Games
Asian Games bronze medalists for South Korea
Medalists at the 2018 Asian Games
Table tennis players at the 2020 Summer Olympics
Olympic table tennis players of South Korea